Jacareí Atlético Clube, commonly known as Jacareí, is a currently inactive Brazilian football club based in Jacareí, São Paulo state.

History
The club was founded on October 27, 1980, after a suggestion broadcast by Rádio Clube Jacareí. They won the Campeonato Paulista Série A3 in 1988.

Achievements

 Campeonato Paulista Série A3:
 Winners (1): 1988

Stadium
Jacareí Atlético Clube play their home games at Estádio Stravos Papadopoulos. The stadium has a maximum capacity of 4,200 people.

References

Association football clubs established in 1980
Football clubs in São Paulo (state)
1980 establishments in Brazil